Erick Dario Fú Lanza (born 17 June 1964) is a retired Honduran football player who played for the national team in the 1980s and 1990s.

Club career
Fú played 65 matches in six years for Honduran giants Olimpia and also played for Victoria. He was sent off in the 1988 championship final.

International career
Fú made his debut for Honduras in the 1980s and has earned a total of 24 caps, scoring no goals. He has represented his country in 2 FIFA World Cup qualification matches and played at the 1993 CONCACAF Gold Cup.

His final international was an October 1996 friendly match against El Salvador.

Retirement
After retiring as a player, Fú has been sports reporter at television programme "Sport 504".

References

External links

1964 births
Living people
Sportspeople from Tegucigalpa
Association football midfielders
Honduran footballers
Honduras international footballers
1993 CONCACAF Gold Cup players
C.D. Olimpia players
C.D. Victoria players
Liga Nacional de Fútbol Profesional de Honduras players